Stygarctus is a genus of tardigrades in the family Stygarctidae. It was named by Erich Schulz in 1951. The name is a combination of Greek Styx and arktos ("bear").

Species
The genus includes the following species:
 Stygarctus abornatus McKirdy, Schmidt & McGinty-Bayly, 1976
 Stygarctus ayatori Fujimoto, 2014
 Stygarctus bradypus Schulz, 1951
 Stygarctus gourbaultae Renaud-Mornant, 1981
 Stygarctus granulatus Pollock, 1970
 Stygarctus lambertii Grimaldi de Zio, D’Addabbo Gallo, Morone De Lucia & Daddabbo, 1987
 Stygarctus spinifer Hiruta, 1985
 Stygarctus keralensis Vishnudattan, Bijoy Nandan, Hansen & Jayachandran, 2021

References

Further reading
 
 Schulz, Über Stygarctus bradypus n. g., n. sp., einen Tardigraden aus dem Küstengrundwasser, und seine phylogenetische Bedeutung. (On Styarctus bradypus) Kieler Meeresforschungen, vol. 8, p. 86-97.
 Nomenclator Zoologicus info

Stygarctidae
Tardigrade genera